Below is the list of populated places in Mardin Province, Turkey by the districts. In the following lists first place in each list is the administrative center of the district.

Mardin

 Mardin
 Acar, Mardin
 Ahmetli, Mardin
 Akbağ, Mardin
 Akıncı, Mardin
 Alakuş, Mardin
 Alımlı, Mardin
 Ambar, Mardin
 Aran, Mardin
 Arpatepe, Mardin
 Aşağıyeniköy, Mardin
 Avcılar, Mardin
 Aytepe, Mardin
 Bağlıca, Mardin
 Boztepe, Mardin
 Buğday, Mardin
 Cevizlik, Mardin
 Cevizpınarı, Mardin
 Çağlar, Mardin
 Çalışlı, Mardin
 Çatak, Mardin
 Çayırpınar, Mardin
 Çıplaktepe, Mardin
 Çiftlikköy, Mardin
 Çukuryurt, Mardin
 Dara, Mardin
 Dibektaş, Mardin
 Düzlük, Mardin
 Elmabahçe, Mardin
 Eroğlu, Mardin
 Eryeri, Mardin
 Esentepe, Mardin
 Eskikale, Mardin
 Göllü, Mardin
 Güneyli, Mardin
 Gürağaç, Mardin
 Hatunlu, Mardin
 Haydar, Mardin
 Hüyüklü, Mardin
 Kabala, Mardin
 Karademir, Mardin
 Konaklı, Mardin
 Kumlu, Mardin
 Kuyulu, Mardin
 Küçükköy, Mardin
 Nur, Mardin
 Ortaköy, Mardin
 Sakalar, Mardin
 Sulak, Mardin
 Sultanköy, Mardin
 Tandır, Mardin
 Tilkitepe, Mardin
 Tozan, Mardin
 Yalım, Mardin
 Yardere, Mardin
 Yayla, Mardin
 Yaylabaşı, Mardin
 Yaylacık, Mardin
 Yaylı, Mardin
 Yenice, Mardin
 Yeniköy, Mardin
 Yolbaşı, Mardin
 Yukarıaydınlı, Mardin
 Yukarıhatunlu, Mardin
 Yukarıyeniköy, Mardin

Dargeçit

 Dargeçit
 Akçaköy, Dargeçit
 Akyol, Dargeçit
 Alayunt, Dargeçit
 Altınoluk, Dargeçit
 Altıyol, Dargeçit
 Bağözü, Dargeçit
 Batur, Dargeçit
 Baysun, Dargeçit
 Beğendi, Dargeçit
 Belen, Dargeçit
 Bostanlı, Dargeçit
 Çatalan, Dargeçit
 Çatalçam, Dargeçit
 Çelikköy, Dargeçit
 Çukurdere, Dargeçit
 Değerli, Dargeçit
 Gürgen, Dargeçit
 Gürışık, Dargeçit
 Ilısu, Dargeçit
 Karabayır, Dargeçit
 Kartalkaya, Dargeçit
 Kılavuz, Dargeçit
 Kısmetli, Dargeçit
 Korucu, Dargeçit
 Suçatı, Dargeçit
 Sümer, Dargeçit
 Tanyeri, Dargeçit
 Tavşanlı, Dargeçit
 Temelli, Dargeçit
 Yanılmaz, Dargeçit
 Yılmaz, Dargeçit
 Yoncalı, Dargeçit

Derik

 Derik
 Adak, Derik
 Adakent, Derik
 Ahmetli, Derik
 Akçay, Derik
 Akıncılar, Derik
 Alagöz, Derik
 Alanlı, Derik
 Alibey, Derik
 Ambarlı, Derik
 Aşağımezra, Derik
 Atlı, Derik
 Aydınlar, Derik
 Ballı, Derik
 Balova, Derik
 Başaran, Derik
 Bayırköy, Derik
 Bayraklı, Derik
 Beşbudak, Derik
 Boyaklı, Derik
 Bozbayır, Derik
 Bozok, Derik
 Böğrek, Derik
 Burçköy, Derik
 Çadırlı, Derik
 Çağıl, Derik
 Çataltepe, Derik
 Çayköy, Derik
 Çukursu, Derik
 Demirli, Derik
 Denktaş, Derik
 Derinsu, Derik
 Dikmen, Derik
 Doğancı, Derik
 Dumanlı, Derik
 Dumluca, Derik
 Düztaş, Derik
 Göktaş, Derik
 Gölbaşı, Derik
 Hisaraltı, Derik
 Ilıca, Derik
 Issız, Derik
 İncesu, Derik
 Kanatlı, Derik
 Karaburun, Derik
 Karataş, Derik
 Kayacık, Derik
 Kocatepe, Derik
 Koçyiğit, Derik
 Konak, Derik
 Konuk, Derik
 Kovalı, Derik
 Kovanlı, Derik
 Köseveli, Derik
 Kuruçay, Derik
 Kuşçu, Derik
 Kutluca, Derik
 Kuyulu, Derik
 Meşeli, Derik
 Ortaca, Derik
 Pınarcık, Derik
 Pirinçli, Derik
 Soğukkuyu, Derik
 Subaşı, Derik
 Şahverdi, Derik
 Şerefli, Derik
 Taşıt, Derik
 Üçkuyu, Derik
 Üçtepe, Derik
 Yazıcık, Derik
 Yukarımezra, Derik

Kızıltepe

 Kızıltepe
 Akalın, Kızıltepe
 Akça, Kızıltepe
 Akçapınar, Kızıltepe
 Akdoğan. Kızıltepe
 Akkoç, Kızıltepe
 Aktepe, Kızıltepe
 Aktulga, Kızıltepe
 Akyazı, Kızıltepe
 Akyüz, Kızıltepe
 Akziyaret, Kızıltepe
 Alakuş, Kızıltepe
 Alemdar. Kızıltepe
 Alipaşa, Kızıltepe
 Altıntoprak, Kızıltepe
 Arakapı, Kızıltepe
 Araköy, Kızıltepe
 Arıklı, Kızıltepe
 Arıtepe, Kızıltepe
 Aslanlı, Kızıltepe
 Aşağıazıklı, Kızıltepe
 Ataköy, Kızıltepe
 Atmaca, Kızıltepe
 Ayaz, Kızıltepe
 Bağrıbütün, Kızıltepe
 Barış, Kızıltepe
 Başak, Kızıltepe
 Bektaş, Kızıltepe
 Belli, Kızıltepe
 Beşdeğirmen, Kızıltepe
 Beşevler, Kızıltepe
 Beşik, Kızıltepe
 Bozhöyük, Kızıltepe
 Büyükayrık, Kızıltepe
 Büyükboğaziye, Kızıltepe
 Büyükdere, Kızıltepe
 Büyüktepe, Kızıltepe
 Cantaşı, Kızıltepe
 Çağıl, Kızıltepe
 Çakır, Kızıltepe
 Çamlıca, Kızıltepe
 Çamlıdere, Kızıltepe
 Çanaklı, Kızıltepe
 Çatalca, Kızıltepe
 Çaybaşı, Kızıltepe
 Çetinler, Kızıltepe
 Çınarcık, Kızıltepe
 Çıplak, Kızıltepe
 Çimenli, Kızıltepe
 Çitlibağ, Kızıltepe
 Damlalı, Kızıltepe
 Demet, Kızıltepe
 Demirci, Kızıltepe
 Demirkap, Kızıltepe
 Demirler, Kızıltepe
 Dikmen, Kızıltepe
 Doğanlı, Kızıltepe
 Dora, Kızıltepe
 Doyuran, Kızıltepe
 Dörtyol, Kızıltepe
 Düğürk, Kızıltepe
 Ekinlik, Kızıltepe
 Elbeyli, Kızıltepe
 Elmalı, Kızıltepe
 Erdem, Kızıltepe
 Erikli, Kızıltepe
 Eroğlu, Kızıltepe
 Esenli, Kızıltepe
 Eskin, Kızıltepe
 Eşme, Kızıltepe
 Eymirli, Kızıltepe
 Fesliğen, Kızıltepe
 Gökçe, Kızıltepe
 Göllü, Kızıltepe
 Gözlüce, Kızıltepe
 Gümüşdere, Kızıltepe
 Güneştepe, Kızıltepe
 Güngören, Kızıltepe
 Günlüce, Kızıltepe
 Gürmeşe, Kızıltepe
 Hacıhasan, Kızıltepe
 Hacıyusuf, Kızıltepe
 Hakverdi, Kızıltepe
 Halkalı, Kızıltepe
 Harmandüzü, Kızıltepe
 Haznedar, Kızıltepe
 Hocaköy, Kızıltepe
 Ilıcak, Kızıltepe
 Işıklar, Kızıltepe
 Işıkören, Kızıltepe
 İkikuyu, Kızıltepe
 İkizler, Kızıltepe
 İnandı, Kızıltepe
 Kalaycık, Kızıltepe
 Karabent, Kızıltepe
 Karakulak, Kızıltepe
 Karakuyu, Kızıltepe
 Karaman, Kızıltepe
 Kaşıklı, Kızıltepe
 Katarlı, Kızıltepe
 Kaynarca, Kızıltepe
 Kengerli, Kızıltepe
 Kılduman, Kızıltepe
 Kırkkuyu, Kızıltepe
 Kilimli, Kızıltepe
 Kocalar, Kızıltepe
 Koçlu, Kızıltepe
 Konuklu, Kızıltepe
 Köprübaşı, Kızıltepe
 Körsu, Kızıltepe
 Küçükayrık, Kızıltepe
 Küçükboğaziye, Kızıltepe
 Küplüce, Kızıltepe
 Odaköy, Kızıltepe
 Ofis, Kızıltepe
 Ortaköy, Kızıltepe
 Otluk, Kızıltepe
 Örencik, Kızıltepe
 Sancarlı, Kızıltepe
 Sandıklı, Kızıltepe
 Sarıca, Kızıltepe
 Saruhan, Kızıltepe
 Sevimli, Kızıltepe
 Soğanlı, Kızıltepe
 Sürekli, Kızıltepe
 Şenyurt Kızıltepe
 Tanrıverdi, Kızıltepe
 Tarlabaşı, Kızıltepe
 Taşlıca, Kızıltepe
 Tatlıca, Kızıltepe
 Tıraşlı, Kızıltepe
 Timurçiftliği, Kızıltepe
 Tosunlu, Kızıltepe
 Tuzla, Kızıltepe
 Tuzluca, Kızıltepe
 Ulaşlı, Kızıltepe
 Uluköy, Kızıltepe
 Uzunkaya, Kızıltepe
 Üçevler, Kızıltepe
 Ülker, Kızıltepe
 Yalınkılıç, Kızıltepe
 Yamaç, Kızıltepe
 Yarımca, Kızıltepe
 Yaşarköy, Kızıltepe
 Yayıklı, Kızıltepe
 Yaylım, Kızıltepe
 Yedikardeş,. Kızıltepe
 Yeşilköy,. Kızıltepe
 Yolaldı,. Kızıltepe
 Yoldere,. Kızıltepe
 Yolüstü, Kızıltepe
 Yoncalı, Kızıltepe
 Yukarıazıklı,. Kızıltepe
 Yumrutaş, Kızıltepe
 Yumurcak, Kızıltepe
 Yurtderi, Kızıltepe
 Yurtözü, Kızıltepe
 Yüceli, Kızıltepe
 Yüksektepe, Kızıltepe
 Ziyaret, Kızıltepe

Mazıdağı

 Mazıdağı
 Aksu, Mazıdağı
 Arıköy, Mazıdağı
 Arısu, Mazıdağı
 Aşağıocak, Mazıdağı
 Atalar, Mazıdağı
 Atlıca, Mazıdağı
 Aykut, Mazıdağı
 Bahçecik, Mazıdağı
 Balpınar, Mazıdağı
 Bilge, Mazıdağı
 Çankaya, Mazıdağı
 Çayönü, Mazıdağı
 Derecik, Mazıdağı
 Dikyamaç, Mazıdağı
 Duraklı, Mazıdağı
 Ekinciler, Mazıdağı
 Engin, Mazıdağı
 Erdalı, Mazıdağı
 Evciler, Mazıdağı
 Gümüşpınar, Mazıdağı
 Gümüşyuva, Mazıdağı
 Gürgöze, Mazıdağı
 Işıkyaka, Mazıdağı
 İkisu, Mazıdağı
 Karaalani, Mazıdağı
 Karataş, Mazıdağı
 Kebapçı, Mazıdağı
 Kemerli, Mazıdağı
 Kışlak, Mazıdağı
 Kocakent, Mazıdağı
 Konur, Mazıdağı
 Meşeli, Mazıdağı
 Ortaklı, Mazıdağı
 Ömürlü, Mazıdağı
 Özlüce, Mazıdağı
 Sağmal, Mazıdağı
 Sakızlı, Mazıdağı
 Şanlı, Mazıdağı
 Şenyuva, Mazıdağı
 Tanrıyolu, Mazıdağı
 Tarlacık, Mazıdağı
 Ulutaş, Mazıdağı
 Ürünlü, Mazıdağı
 Yağmur, Mazıdağı
 Yalınağaç, Mazıdağı
 Yeşilköy, Mazıdağı
 Yetkinler, Mazıdağı
 Yukarıkonak, Mazıdağı
 Yukarıocak, Mazıdağı
 Yüce, Mazıdağı
 Yücebağ, Mazıdağı

Midyat

 Midyat
 Acırlı, Midyat
 Adaklı, Midyat
 Alagöz, Midyat
 Altıntaş, Midyat
 Anıtlı, Midyat
 Bağlarbaşı, Midyat
 Bardakçı, Midyat
 Barıştepe, Midyat
 Başyurt, Midyat
 Budaklı, Midyat
 Çaldere, Midyat
 Çalpınar, Midyat
 Çamyurt, Midyat
 Çandarlı, Midyat
 Çavuşlu, Midyat
 Çayırlı, Midyat
 Danışman, Midyat
 Doğançay, Midyat
 Doğanyazı, Midyat
 Dolunay, Midyat
 Düzgeçit, Midyat
 Düzoba, Midyat
 Eğlence, Midyat
 Elbeğendi, Midyat
 Erişti, Midyat
 Gelinkaya, Midyat
 Gülgöze, Midyat
 Gülveren, Midyat
 Güngören, Midyat
 Güven, Midyat
 Hanlar, Midyat
 Harmanlı, Midyat
 İkizdere, Midyat
 İzbırak, Midyat
 Kayabaşı, Midyat
 Kayalar, Midyat
 Kayalıpınar, Midyat
 Kutlubey, Midyat
 Mercimekli, Midyat
 Narlı, Midyat
 Ortaca, Midyat
 Pelitli, Midyat
 Sarıkaya, Midyat
 Sarıköy, Midyat
 Sivrice, Midyat
 Söğütlü, Midyat
 Şenköy, Midyat
 Taşlıburç, Midyat
 Tepeli, Midyat
 Toptepe, Midyat
 Tulgalı, Midyat
 Üçağıl, Midyat
 Yayvantepe, Midyat
 Yemişli, Midyat
 Yenice, Midyat
 Yeşilöz, Midyat
 Yolbaşı, Midyat
 Yuvalı, Midyat
 Ziyaret, Midyat

Nusaybin

 Nusaybin
 Açıkköy, Nusaybin
 Açıkyol, Nusaybin
 Akağıl, Nusaybin
 Akarsu, Nusaybin
 Akçatarla, Nusaybin
 Bahçebaşı, Nusaybin
 Bakacık, Nusaybin
 Balaban, Nusaybin
 Beylik, Nusaybin
 Büyükkardeş, Nusaybin
 Çağlar, Nusaybin
 Çalı, Nusaybin
 Çatalözü, Nusaybin
 Çiğdem, Nusaybin
 Çilesiz, Nusaybin
 Çölova, Nusaybin
 Dağiçi, Nusaybin
 Dallıağaç, Nusaybin
 Demirtepe, Nusaybin
 Dibek, Nusaybin
 Dirim, Nusaybin
 Doğanlı, Nusaybin
 Doğuş, Nusaybin
 Durakbaşı, Nusaybin
 Duruca, Nusaybin
 Düzce, Nusaybin
 Eskihisar, Nusaybin
 Eskimağara, Nusaybin
 Eskiyol, Nusaybin
 Girmeli, Nusaybin
 Görentepe, Nusaybin
 Günebakan, Nusaybin
 Günyurdu, Nusaybin
 Gürün, Nusaybin
 Güvenli, Nusaybin
 Hasantepe, Nusaybin
 Heybeli, Nusaybin
 İkiztepe, Nusaybin
 İlkadım, Nusaybin
 Kalecik, Nusaybin
 Kantar, Nusaybin
 Karaca, Nusaybin
 Kayadibi, Nusaybin
 Kocadağ, Nusaybin
 Kuruköy, Nusaybin
 Kuyular, Nusaybin
 Küçükkardeş, Nusaybin
 Nergizli, Nusaybin
 Odabaşı, Nusaybin
 Sınırtepe, Nusaybin
 Söğütlü, Nusaybin
 Taşköy, Nusaybin
 Tepealtı, Nusaybin
 Tepeören, Nusaybin
 Tepeüstü, Nusaybin
 Turgutlu, Nusaybin
 Üçköy, Nusaybin
 Üçyol, Nusaybin
 Yandere, Nusaybin
 Yavruköy, Nusaybin
 Yazyurdu, Nusaybin
 Yerköy, Nusaybin
 Yolbilen, Nusaybin
 Yolindi, Nusaybin

Ömerli

 Ömerli
 Akyokuş, Ömerli
 Alıçlı, Ömerli
 Anıttepe, Ömerli
 Beşikkaya, Ömerli
 Çalışan, Ömerli
 Çatalyurt, Ömerli
 Çayıralanı, Ömerli
 Çınaraltı, Ömerli
 Çimenlik, Ömerli
 Duygulu, Ömerli
 Fıstıklı, Ömerli
 Göllü, Ömerli
 Güzelağaç, Ömerli
 Harmankaya, Ömerli
 Havuzbaşı, Ömerli
 Işıkdere, Ömerli
 İkipınar, Ömerli
 İkitepe, Ömerli
 Kayabalı, Ömerli
 Kayadere, Ömerli
 Kayagöze, Ömerli
 Kayaüstü, Ömerli
 Kaynakkaya, Ömerli
 Kocakuyu, Ömerli
 Kocasırt, Ömerli
 Kovanlı, Ömerli
 Kömürlü, Ömerli
 Mutluca, Ömerli
 Ovabaşı, Ömerli
 Öztaş, Ömerli
 Pınarcık, Ömerli
 Salihköy, Ömerli
 Sivritepe, Ömerli
 Sulakdere, Ömerli
 Taşgedik, Ömerli
 Taşlıca, Ömerli
 Tavuklu, Ömerli
 Tekkuyu, Ömerli
 Tokdere, Ömerli
 Topağaç, Ömerli
 Ünsallı, Ömerli
 Yaylatepe, Ömerli

Savur

 Savur
 Akyürek, Savur
 Armutalan, Savur
 Bağyaka, Savur
 Başağaç, Savur
 Başkavak, Savur
 Bengisu, Savur
 Çınarönü, Savur
 Dereiçi, Savur
 Durusu, Savur
 Erkuran, Savur
 Gölbaşı, Savur
 Harmantepe, Savur
 Hisarkaya, Savur
 İçören, Savur
 İşgören, Savur
 Karaköy, Savur
 Kayacıklar, Savur
 Kayatepe, Savur
 Kırbalı, Savur
 Kırkdirek, Savur
 Kocahüyük, Savur
 Koşuyolu, Savur
 Köprülü, Savur
 Ormancık, Savur
 Pınardere, Savur
 Sancaklı, Savur
 Serenli, Savur
 Soylu, Savur
 Sürgücü, Savur
 Şenocak, Savur
 Taşlık, Savur
 Tokluca, Savur
 Üçerli, Savur
 Üçkavak, Savur
 Yaylayanı, Savur
 Yazır, Savur
 Yenilmez, Savur
 Yeşilalan, Savur

Yeşilli

 Yeşilli
 Alıçlı, Yeşilli
 Bülbül, Yeşilli
 Dereyanı, Yeşilli
 Koyunlu, Yeşilli
 Kütüklü, Yeşilli
 Ovaköy, Yeşilli
 Sancar, Yeşilli
 Uzunköy, Yeşilli
 Zeytinli, Yeşilli

Recent development

According to Law act no 6360, all Turkish provinces with a population more than 750 000, were renamed as metropolitan municipality. Furthermore, the central district was renamed as Artuklu. All districts in those provinces became second level municipalities and all villages in those districts  were renamed as a neighborhoods . Thus the villages listed above are officially neighborhoods of Mardin.

References

List
Mardin